Tuku may refer to:

People 
 Oliver Mtukudzi (1952–2019), Zimbabwean musician
 Shamsul Hoque Tuku (born 1948), Bangladeshi politician
 Tuku Morgan (born 1957), New Zealand politician

Places 
 Tuku, Yunlin, a township in Taiwan
 Tuku Nature Reserve, New Zealand
 Tuco (mountain), in Peru
 Tuku Wachanan

Other uses 
 Tuku dialect of the Sakata language